The University of North Dakota men's ice hockey team competed in the Western Collegiate Hockey Association.

Season Stats

Final Record

Standings

2012–13 schedule and results 
  Green background indicates regulation or overtime win.
  Red background indicates regulation or overtime loss.
  White background indicates tie or overtime tie.

Notes:

(EX) Denotes an exhibition game

† Denotes a non-conference game

Player statistics
Final Stats

Skaters

References

North Dakota Fighting Hawks men's ice hockey seasons
North Dakota